Androthrips is a genus of thrips in the family Phlaeothripidae, first described by Heinrich Hugo Karny in 1911.

Species
 Androthrips coimbatorensis
 Androthrips collaris
 Androthrips crus
 Androthrips flavipes
 Androthrips flavitibia
 Androthrips guiyangensis
 Androthrips kurosawai
 Androthrips melastomae
 Androthrips monsterae
 Androthrips obscuratus
 Androthrips ochraceus
 Androthrips ramachandrai

References

External links
Thrips Wiki: Androthrips

Phlaeothripidae
Thrips
Thrips genera
Taxa named by Heinrich Hugo Karny
Taxa described in 1911